Oak Hill High School (OHHS) is a public high school in Oak Hill, Ohio, United States. It is the only high school in the Oak Hill Union Local School District. The high school and elementary school are both located just north of the city limits on Route 93.

Athletics 

The school's athletic affiliation is with the Ohio High School Athletic Association (OHSAA) and the Southern Ohio Conference (SOC), which has seventeen member schools and is divided into two divisions (SOC I & SOC II) based on the schools' enrollment. The SOC includes teams from four different Ohio counties.

Ohio High School Athletic Association championships 

 Boys Basketball - 2009

References

External links 
 

High schools in Jackson County, Ohio
Public high schools in Ohio
Public middle schools in Ohio